Achache is a surname.  Notable people with the surname include:

 Jean Achache (born 1952), French film producer, screenwriter, director, and writer
 José Achache (born 1953), French scientist
 Mona Achache (born 1981), Moroccan-French film director